William John Scott (August 2, 1920 – November 29, 1985) was an American voice actor, writer and producer for animated cartoons, primarily associated with Jay Ward and UPA, as well as one of the founding members of ASIFA-Hollywood. He is probably best known as the head writer, co-producer and the voice of several characters from the popular programs Rocky and His Friends and The Bullwinkle Show.

Career
Scott was born in Philadelphia, Pennsylvania on August 2, 1920. The family later moved to Trenton, New Jersey, and in 1936 to Denver, Colorado.  Scott graduated from the University of Denver with a degree in English.

During World War II he served in the U.S. Army's First Motion Picture Unit (reporting to Lt. Ronald Reagan), where he worked with such animators as Frank Thomas. After the war, he became what was then known as a "story man" at Warner Bros., working under director Arthur Davis. After a job as a writer on Bob Clampett's Time For Beany television puppet show, he later worked at United Productions of America where he was one of the writers who adapted Dr. Seuss's original story for the 1950 Academy Award-winning short Gerald McBoing-Boing, which later became a television show, as well as adapting the 1953 Academy Award-nominated short film of Edgar Allan Poe's The Tell-Tale Heart.

Scott began work as a voice actor as well when he joined Jay Ward as head writer and co-producer, and voice acted in such television series as The Bullwinkle Show (most notably as Bullwinkle and Mister Peabody, as well as Dudley Do-Right). In a 1982 interview, Scott said, "I got a call from Jay [Ward] asking if I'd be interested in writing another series, an adventure script with a moose and a squirrel. I said, 'Sure.' I didn't know if I could write an adventure with a moose and a squirrel, but I never turned down a job."  Scott never received an on-screen credit for his voice acting on any of the Ward series.

He also wrote many commercials for General Mills because General Mills had financed much of The Rocky and Bullwinkle Show, and the Quaker Oats Company, most notably those for Cap'n Crunch cereal. The voices of Rocky, Nell, Fenwick and many of the feminine roles were performed by June Foray, although Scott's wife, Dorothy, voiced several female parts as well.

Scott was a voice director on The Gerald McBoing-Boing Show and a dialogue director on the 1959 animated comedy feature film 1001 Arabian Nights.

He starred in the George of the Jungle series as George, Super Chicken, and Tom Slick, as well as Fractured Flickers and Hoppity Hooper. Scott also did live-action acting on the television show The Duck Factory, which starred Jim Carrey, as well as featuring noted voice actors Don Messick and Frank Welker. In the episode "The Annie Awards", Scott plays the emcee at an award ceremony for cartoonists.

Scott was a member of the Screen Cartoonist's Guild of which he was President in 1952.  He was also a member of the Screen Actors Guild and was elected to the Board of Governors of the Academy of Motion Picture Arts and Sciences.

Later career
Toward the end of his career, Scott worked for Disney, where he voiced Moosel on The Wuzzles, and was Gruffi Gummi, Sir Tuxford, and Toadwart, aka Toadie in Disney's Adventures of the Gummi Bears (he was succeeded by Corey Burton, Roger C. Carmel, and Brian Cummings after his death). Gummi Bears, his last role, had also reunited him with June Foray, his Rocky and Bullwinkle co-star. Scott was also a singer and performer, active with a Little Theatre group in Tujunga called the Foothill Curtain Raisers, and a church theater, the Ascension Players.  He was a member of the choir at Ascension Episcopal Church, Tujunga, and a member of the Cañada-Savoy G&S troupe in La Cañada, California.

Death
Scott died of a heart attack at age 65 on November 29, 1985 in Tujunga, Los Angeles, California. He was cremated, and his ashes were scattered in the Santa Barbara Channel off Ventura.

Notes

Further reading
Jim Korkis. "Bullwinkle at Warner's: Bill Scott's Early Days at Warner Bros, an Interview by Jim Korkis." Animato no.20 (Spring 1990), pp. 7–9.

References

Television producers from Pennsylvania
1920 births
1985 deaths
20th-century American male actors
American male screenwriters
American male voice actors
American television writers
First Motion Picture Unit personnel
Jay Ward Productions
Male actors from Philadelphia
American male television writers
American voice directors
University of Denver alumni
Warner Bros. Cartoons people
20th-century American male writers
20th-century American screenwriters